Richard Pearson may refer to:

Richard Pearson (Royal Navy officer) (1731–1806), British sea captain
Richard Pearson (physician) (1765–1836), English medical writer
Richard Pearson (police officer) (1831–1890), Assistant Commissioner (Executive) of the London Metropolitan Police, 1881–1890
Richard Pearson (actor) (1918–2011), British film, television and stage actor
Richard J. Pearson (born 1938), Canadian expert in East Asian archaeology
Richard Pearson (film editor) (born 1961), film editor
Richard Pearson (cricketer) (born 1972), English cricketer

See also
Richard Pearson Strong (1872–1948), tropical medicine professor at Harvard